Minutargyrotoza minuta is a species of moth of the family Tortricidae. It is found in Japan on the islands of Hokkaido, Honshu, Shikoku and Kyushu.

The wingspan is about 13.5 mm. Adults are on wing from the beginning of April to mid-June.

References

Moths described in 1900
Archipini